Gurbir may refer to:

Potentilla indica, a flowering plant native to eastern and southern Asia 
Gurbir Grewal (born 1973), an American politician